WBIP (1400 AM) is a radio station licensed to Booneville, Mississippi, United States.  The station airs a country music format (simulcasting WADI 95.3 FM Corinth) and is owned by Community Broadcasting Services of Mississippi, Inc.

History
WBIP began broadcasting on September 1, 1950. It aired block programming and was owned by E. O. Roden. Elvis Presley was interviewed on the station in February 1955.

A country music format was aired in the 1970s and 1980s. By 1993, southern gospel programming was added. In 1995, the station was sold to Community Broadcasting Services of Mississippi, along with 99.3 WBIP-FM, for $400,000. It became a Real Country affiliate later that year. In 1997, the station adopted a sports talk format. By 2003, the station had adopted a classic country format. The station also aired southern gospel block programming, which would eventually become its primary format. By 2019, the station had adopted a Christian contemporary format.

On November 25, 2022 WBIP flipped to a simulcast of country-formatted WADI 95.3 FM Corinth.

Translator
WBIP is also heard on 99.7 MHz, through a translator in Booneville, Mississippi.

Previous logo

References

External links

Country radio stations in the United States
Radio stations established in 1950
1950 establishments in Mississippi
BIP